Battle Squadron is a vertically scrolling shooter for the Amiga for one or two players.  It is a sequel to Hybris. A version for the Mega Drive was released in 1990. The game was later ported to iOS devices (2011), Android (2012) and in 2013 also to AmigaOS 4, Windows, OS X and MorphOS.

Plot
Taking place many years in the future in another star system, a century long war is waging between the Earth Defense Fleet and the Barrax Empire. Two Earth Defense Commanders, Lori Bergin and Barry Mayers, were returning from a research and destroy mission regarding the latest Barrax technologies on planet Urania, when suddenly a Barrax cruiser materialized behind them, brought their ship in and took the commanders hostage on planet Terrainia. The player's mission is to rescue the Commanders and eliminate all Barrax threats in the process.

Gameplay

Battle Squadron supports both mouse and joystick controlled play. The game is played from the perspective of elite fighter pilots of the Earth Defense Fleet, known as the Battle Squadron sent to rescue two human agents, Commanders Berry D. Mayers and Lori Bergin, from the clutches of the ruthless alien empire, known as the Barrax. The player's fighters carry unlimited projectile weaponry and a finite number of Nova Smart Bombs. Players acquire weapons by shooting down Barraxian Artillery Gunships which carry weapon Power-Up icons. Weapons include the Red Magnetic Torps, the powerful Green Emerald Laser, the two-way firing Blue Anti-Matter Particle Beam and the sideways firing Orange Magma Wave. Other pick-up items include Barraxian jewel caches marked by small green X's which are worth 1000 points each. The player has the option to increase the number and speed of enemy bullets therefore altering the game's difficulty.

Notable features of the game are relatively big sprites (with Predator-esque cloaking effects applied to a few) and numerous weapon upgrades (supposedly 25 in total). Barraxian opponents consist of ground installations (generally gun turrets and launch platforms), ground vehicles, aircraft and numerous genetically-engineered living weapons.

Enemies include:
Cargo vehicles that drop weapon upgrades upon destruction.
Four-craft squadrons of Barrax fighters that will release an extra, collectable Nova Bomb upon destruction of the entire squadron.
Two different varieties of gigantic, apparently robotic terror machines, functioning as the bosses of two separate levels.
What appear to be several giant faces in the terrain, once again, serving as end-of-level bosses.
The Barrax Nova Cruiser, the end-game boss.

External links
 
 Battle Squadron Soundtrack Remix by the original composer, Ron Klaren
 Entry for Battle Squadron at Hall of Light
 Downloadable demo versions of Battle Squadron

1989 video games
Amiga games
AmigaOS 4 games
MorphOS games
IOS games
Android (operating system) games
Vertically scrolling shooters
Video games developed in Denmark
Sega Genesis games